West Valley High School (WVHS) is a public high school in Fairbanks, Alaska, United States, one of four standalone high schools and one of ten schools offering instruction in grades nine through twelve in the Fairbanks North Star Borough School District.  Physically located adjacent to the University of Alaska Fairbanks (UAF) campus in the census-designated place boundaries of College, WVHS and crosstown rival Lathrop High School cover a combined attendance area encompassing the majority of the urban core and outskirts of Fairbanks, with WVHS's attendance area serving the westernmost portions of that area.  The Alaska Department of Education & Early Development reported the school's enrollment at 1,027 on October 1, 2015.  The school mascot is the Wolfpack and its colors are red and gold.  WVHS is highly regarded as a school that possesses one of the most rigorous educational experiences that can be found anywhere in the state of Alaska. Teachers, students, and administrators have received a myriad of awards that have confirmed West Valley's position as a prideful and genuine educationally advanced institution.

History
The architect of West Valley High School was CCC/HOK Architects and Planners of Anchorage. Originally scheduled to open at the beginning of the 1976 school year, construction delays caused the school to open after the school year had already started. To make up for the lost time, mandatory Saturday school days were put in place for three months. The facility was built to accommodate 750 students, but the 1976–77 school year saw over 1000 students.  In 1994, the Hutchison Career Center, now called Hutchison High School and located next door to the east, started to house additional high school classes during the school day. A major renovation of the school was completed in 2000, roughly doubling the amount of classroom space to serve up to 1300 students.

The current principal of West Valley is Sarah Gillam, who replaced Shaun Kraska —who had been an English teacher for several years prior — in 2016. At the school's inception it come to be known as "Mr. Rodgers' Neighborhood" after long time school administrator Bill Rodgers. There is a glass cage with three stuffed wolves, completed c. 1977, in West Valley's main commons.  It is known as the "wolf cage" and is one way the school greets its students and visitors.

Building and grounds
WVHS and Hutchison were built on the southeast corner of the UAF campus, on a mostly undeveloped tract separated from UAF's lower campus core by the Alaska Railroad tracks (University Park Elementary was built on the northeast corner of that tract in the late 1950s).  The grounds include a football field and track, a soccer field, a baseball field, and other recreational areas. The building has two floors and is divided into three main sections, one of which houses most of the classrooms, one the administrative offices and library, and one the gymnasium and other special-use rooms.

Academics
There are eight academic departments at West Valley: Career Technical Education, Health and Physical Education, Fine Arts, English Language Arts, Mathematics, Science, Global Studies, and World Languages.  An appointed teacher chairs each department. Students are required to take a number of classes in most departments in order to graduate. West Valley's academics consistently rank highly among other schools in the state. In 2015, West Valley was ranked 3rd of all high schools in the state.

Graduation requirements
Students at West Valley are required to obtain:
 4 credits in English/Language Arts
 3 credits in Mathematics
 3 credits in Science
 3.5 credits in Social Studies (1 yr world, 1 yr US, 1 sem Gov., 1 sem Econ., 1 sem Ak Studies)
 1.5 credits in P.E. (can be waived with school sports)
 0.5 credit in Health
 8.0 credits in general electives

A credit equals one year of courses (two semesters). Students must have a total of 22.5 credits to graduate. It is highly recommended that students take at least two years of a foreign language.  Languages offered are French, Japanese, Chinese, and Spanish.

Language programs
The school offers French, Spanish, and Chinese languages, and students may choose to take Japanese for dual credit through the University of Alaska Fairbanks.  The school also regularly sends participants to both regional and state level Language Declamation contests. The regionals are held locally, and the state competition usually takes place in Anchorage. West Valley often is home to many state champions in this program, including 2009 state champions Jasper Holton and Andrew James.

Ignition 
Ignition is a comprehensive and highly inclusive day for incoming freshmen. On the first day of school for students K-8, only freshmen come to school at all district high schools. On this day, upper-class mentors play fun and educational games with freshmen to help them acclimate to the high school environment.  Ignition is one of several transition supports for freshmen; others include a freshman counselor, freshman assistant principal and FUN Physical Education, a freshman only PE class.

Advanced Placement
West Valley offers a number of Advanced Placement courses.  These are college-level alternatives to, or enhancements of, standard high school courses.  In the 2015–2016 school year, West Valley offered the following AP courses:

 Biology
 Calculus AB & BC
 Chemistry
 Computer Science
 AP Economics (Micro and Macro)
 AP Statistics
 English Language & Composition
 English Literature
 Government
 U.S. History

Extracurriculars

Music
West Valley offers a variety of music electives, including Jazz Band, Concert Band, Symphonic Band, Concert Orchestra, Chamber Orchestra, Mixed and Concert Choirs, and Steel Drums. Many individuals and groups compete in the All-State Music Festival in the fall and Statewide Solo & Small Ensemble Competition held every spring. In the 2015–16 school year, four West Valley orchestra members received first chair awards at the All-State Music Festival. Also in the 2015–16 school year, West Valley boasted cello solo, flute ensemble, violin solo, mixed instrument ensemble, musical theater solo, and string ensemble all receiving command performances at Solo & Ensemble.

Sports
West Valley offers all standard high school sports, including swimming, baseball, basketball, cross-country running and skiing, football, gymnastics, hockey, soccer, softball, tennis, track and field, wrestling, rifle and volleyball. The West Valley girls' cross-country running team won the 2005, 2006, and 2009 state championships. They competed in Nike Team Nationals in 2005 and 2006. In the 2005 season they earned 15th place at the Nike Team Nationals and in 2006 were ranked ninth in the nation. The gymnastics team took the Regional Championships for 2007, 2008, and 2009. Other recent state championships include the 2005 state title earned by the women's cross-country skiing team, the 2005 state title earned by the women's track-and-field program, and the 2003 state title earned by the school's wrestling team. West Valley's wrestling program (over the years) has the most state titles compared to any other sport and also boasts the most individual state champions. The school regularly sends participants to both regionals and state. West Valley wrestling created an Alaskan Dynasty by winning the state championships 5 years in a row from 1987 to 1991, and posting a duel match record of 176-1-1 under Coach Dave Toney and Tom Ritchie, who emphasized "promoting self pride to create better citizens". It is also notable to say that at Dogbowl, a football competition between West Valley and Lathrop High School, West Valley Won At Home 2017 8–6. Other than that, Sam Schmoker from West Valley earned the state champion in tennis, continuing West Valley's strong tradition in sports.

Student government and council structure
West Valley has a student body council as well as a council for each class. Each student government has an advisor and five officers. There are often opportunities for members to also become involved in AASG (the Alaska Association of Student Governments), and to serve on both the regional board of Fairbanks Student Councils, as well as on the state board.

Academic Decathlon
West Valley has competed in the United States Academic Decathlon since 1986. Its Academic Decathlon team has won 11 state championships; its most recent victory was in February 2015. West Valley has competed at the national finals many times, including in Hawaii in April 2007 when it achieved the highest score of any Alaska school in history.

Newspaper
West Valley's newspaper, The Howler, was founded in 2005. It puts out two to three issues per semester. A previous school newspaper named The Blizzard was published intermittently up to the late 1990s.

Yearbook
The school's yearbook, the Aurora, is published by Walsworth Publishing Company and comes out in May.  Yearbook is a yearlong class and extracurricular activity.

Airband
Airband is a class competition where the different classes and a team composed of staff are given eight minutes to dance and lip sync to pre-recorded songs. Airband is one of the most popular events of the year and occurs in the spring semester.

Mock Trial
Mock Trial is a student-led organization with a coach that gets students involved by having them compete with other students in real legal issues. West Valley students compete with others from all across the state and each have positions in this virtual trial. The witnesses, judge, prosecutors and defending attorneys are all students. Each year, the Mock Trial Club gets a new case to study and analyze and then goes on to compete in a regional and state competition.

Notable alumni

 Jon Button – bass player
 Quannah Chasinghorse – model and social activist
 Linda Kay Fickus (1983) – the inaugural Miss Alaska Teen USA
 Vivica Genaux (1987) – opera singer
 Ruthy Hebard (2016) – current WNBA player with the Chicago Sky
 Kendall Kramer – cross-country skier
 Kelly Moneymaker (1985) – pop singer who performed with the group Exposé
 Heather Royer (1992) - economist
 Paul Varelans – mixed martial artist

See also
 List of high schools in Alaska

References

External links
 
 School library homepage

1975 establishments in Alaska
Educational institutions established in 1975
Schools in Fairbanks North Star Borough, Alaska
Public high schools in Alaska